This is an overview of the 2016 Iranian Assembly of Experts election in Tehran Province.

The voter turnout was 53.11% in the constituency.

Results

Notes and references

2016 elections in Iran
Elections in Tehran
2010s in Tehran